The 2016 6 Hours of Bahrain was an endurance sports car racing event held on the Grand Prix Circuit of the Bahrain International Circuit, Sakhir, Bahrain on 17–19 November 2016, and served as the ninth and last race of the 2016 FIA World Endurance Championship. The race was won by the #8 Audi R18 of Loïc Duval, Lucas di Grassi and Oliver Jarvis, run by Audi Sport Team Joest.

Qualifying

Qualifying result
Pole position in Class is in bold.

 – The No. 26 G-Drive Racing all laptimes deleted because of both its front brakes cooling ducts were not fitted with mesh.

Race

Race result
The minimum number of laps for classification (70% of the overall winning car's race distance) was 141 laps. Class winners in bold.

References

8 Hours of Bahrain
6 Hours of Bahrain
Bahrain
6 Hours of Bahrain